The long-tailed armored tree-rat (Makalata macrura), is a spiny rat species from South America. It is found in Brazil, with a population in Ecuador which is referable either to this species or to Makalata didelphoides. Initially considered a large form of the latter species, it actually represents a distinct species as supported by morphological and molecular characters.

References

Makalata
Mammals of Brazil
Mammals described in 1842